Meet Mr. Malcolm is a 1954 British crime film directed by Daniel Birt and starring Adrianne Allen, Sarah Lawson and Meredith Edwards. It was made at Kensington Studios as a second feature.

Synopsis
Crime  writer Colin Knowles (Richard Gale) is called in by his estranged wife Louie (Sarah Lawson) to solve a real-life murder when her employer's body is found at the bottom of a cliff.

Cast
 Adrianne Allen as Mrs. Durant  
 Sarah Lawson as Louie Knowles  
 Richard Gale as Colin Knowles  
 Duncan Lamont as Supt. Simmons  
 Meredith Edwards as Whistler Grant  
 Pamela Galloway as Andrea Durant  
 John Horsley as Tony Barlow  
 John Blythe as Carrington-Phelps  
 Claude Dampier as Joe Tutt  
 Nigel Green as police sgt.
 Simone Lovell 
 Jean St. Clair as Mrs O’Connor
 Derek Prentice

Critical reception
TV Guide dismissed it as "Not very interesting."

References

Bibliography
 Chibnall, Steve & McFarlane, Brian. The British 'B' Film. Palgrave MacMillan, 2009.

External links

1954 films
British crime films
1954 crime films
Films directed by Daniel Birt
Films shot at Kensington Studios
Films shot in London
1950s English-language films
British black-and-white films
1950s British films